Keta Municipal District is one of the eighteen districts in Volta Region, Ghana. Originally created as an ordinary district assembly in 1988 when it was known as Keta District, which was created from the former Anlo District Council, until it was elevated to municipal district assembly status on 1 November 2007 (effectively 29 February 2008) to become Keta Municipal District. However on 19 February 2019, the western part of the district was split off to create Anloga District; thus the remaining part has been retained as Keta Municipal District. The municipality is located in the southeast part of Volta Region and has Keta as its capital town.

Boundaries
Keta Municipal District is bounded by:

 the Gulf of Guinea to the east and south,
 River Volta and South Tongu District to the west,
 Akatsi District to the north and northwest, and
 Ketu South Municipal District to the northeast.

Villages
In addition to Keta, the capital and administrative centre, Anloga (Angloga) , Anyako and Abor are the only towns, Keta Municipal District contains the following villages:

 Abonokofe (village)
 Abor (town)
 Agbatsivi (village)
 Agobledokui (village)
 Agortoe (village)
 Agovinu (village)
 Akplorlortorkor (village)
 Anlo Afiadenyigba (village)
 Anloga (town)
 Anyako (town)
 Anyanui (village)
 Asadame (village)
 Atiavi (village)
 Atiteti / Antititi (village)
 Atito / Achito (village)
 Atorkor (village)
 Bomigo (village)
 Bleamezado (village)
 Dzelukope (village)
 Dzita (village)
 Dzita-Agbledomi (village)
 Fuveme (village)
 Galo-Sota (village)
 Gbetuinu (village)
 Hatorgodo (village)
 Horvi(village)
 Kedzi (village)
 Salo (village)
 Sasieme (village)
 Seva, Ghana|Seva (village)
 Srogbe (village)
 Tegbi (village)
 Trekume (village)
 Tregui (village)
 Tsiame (village)
 Tunu (village)
 Vodza (village)
 Weme (village)
 Woe (village)
 Wuti (village)

Geography

Climate
Tropical savanna climates have monthly mean temperature above 18 °C (64 °F) in every month of the year and typically a pronounced dry season, with the driest month having precipitation less than 60mm (2.36 in) of precipitation.  The Köppen Climate Classification subtype for this climate is "Aw". (Tropical Savanna Climate).

Sources
 
 Keta Municipal District on GhanaDistricts.com

External links
 Keta Municipal District Official Website

References 

Districts of Volta Region